Kevin McHugh; born 19 January 1980 in Letterkenny, Ireland) is an Irish former footballer and current manager of Finn Harps F.C. under-15 League of Ireland team. He is considered one of Donegal's best-known sportstars.

Career
McHugh was born in Letterkenny and raised in the border town of Killea in County Donegal.

Finn Harps
McHugh scored and made his debut for Ballybofey-side, Finn Harps, against Fanad United in the League of Ireland Cup as just a novice 17-year-old in August 1998. He went on to make 184 appearances for the side, building up a reputation as one of the deadliest forwards in the Irish game by scoring 110 league goals. In 2005, the striker became one of just five then-current players to join the 38-strong group of players to have scored 100 or more league goals in the modern era.

McHugh scored his 99th and 100th League of Ireland goals at Finn Park on 22 October 2005 as Harps thrashed Longford 5-0 .

Despite the relegation of Finn Harps from the League of Ireland Premier Division, McHugh finished third highest scorer in the 2005 season with 13 goals. He attracted the attention of other clubs, including Shelbourne and Bohemian, before the beginning of the 2006 season.

Only Brendan Bradley has scored more goals than McHugh for Finn Harps. In his first spell at the club, the Killea man scored 122 goals in 248 games for Harps and was top scorer for the club in six successive seasons from 2000/01 until he left Finn Park in 2005.

He was top scorer in the First Division three times in a row with Harps.

Linfield
Kevin McHugh signed a two and a half-year contract with Linfield in January 2009. Kevin scored his first Linfield goal on his first start with a last gasp winner at home to Institute. He had a setback at the start of the next season, with a serious hamstring injury. This left him sidelined for over 4 months, never recovered and left and returned to Finn Park for their preseason.

Return to Finn Harps
McHugh signed back for Harps in February 2010

In his first three seasons back with the Ballybofey club he has scored 36 goals, 12 in his first season, 11 in his second and 13 goals in 2012 making him ninth in the all-time League of Ireland goalscoring list with 154 league goals.

His testimonial was contested by a Donegal GAA select and a Finn Harps select at Finn Park, with one half Gaelic football and the other half soccer.

In October 2016, McHugh suffered a freak injury while hosting an under-age coaching session in Donegal. When he was jumping over a gate to get a set of goalposts, his wedding ring got caught in the fence and he severed a finger. The finger was too badly damaged to be repaired and the injury ended his football career.

In November 2016, McHugh was named as the manager of the Finn Harps under-15 team for the inaugural League of Ireland under-15 season which got underway in August 2017.

Kildrum Tigers
McHugh has also played for Kildrum Tigers.

Trivia
Kevin is fifth in the all-time League of Ireland goalscoring list with 174 league goals.

Honours
Individual
 League of Ireland First Division Player of the Year 
 2002, 2004
 League of Ireland First Division Top Scorer 
 2001–02, 2002–03, 2004, 2012: 4 
Finn Harps 
 League of Ireland First Division 
 2004: 1
Derry City 
 FAI Cup 
 2006: 1
 League of Ireland Cup 
 2006, 2007, 2008: 1

See also
 Northwest Derby

References

External links
 
 BBC Sport Online – Derry City capture striker McHugh (2006-01-05)
 Kevin McHugh Signs For Linfield
 

1980 births
Living people
People from Letterkenny
Association footballers from County Donegal
Association football forwards
Republic of Ireland association footballers
League of Ireland players
NIFL Premiership players
Finn Harps F.C. players
Omagh Town F.C. players
Derry City F.C. players
Linfield F.C. players
Kildrum Tigers F.C. players